Banovci is a village in the Municipality of Veržej in northeastern Slovenia. The area is part of the traditional region of Styria. It is now included with the rest of the municipality in the Mura Statistical Region.

It is best known for its spa.

References

External links
Banovci at Geopedia

Populated places in the Municipality of Veržej
Spa towns in Slovenia